The 1996 Premier League season was the 62nd season of the top tier of speedway in the United Kingdom. It was also the second and last edition of two seasons, in which British speedway was competed as a single division. In addition there was a Conference League. 

As from 1997 the Elite League would be the top division and the Premier League would be the second division.

Summary
The one league set up only lasted for a second season due to the huge disparity between the sides. Wolverhampton Wolves won the title for the second time in six years, with American Ronnie Correy being the sole survivor of the 1991 winning team. In a strange coincidence a new set of two brothers helped Wolves win the title, back in 1991 it was the Ermolenko brothers but now it was the Swedish Karlsson brothers. Peter Karlsson and Mikael Karlsson both scored heavily and ended the season with averages around the 10 mark.

Cradley Heathens and Stoke Potters merged for the 1996 season and despite their American stars Billy Hamill and Greg Hancock finishing first and second in the averages they could only manage fifth place in the league. Cradley Heath were disbanded after the season following the closure of Dudley Wood Stadium, their home venue.

Final table
PL = Matches; W = Wins; D = Draws; L = Losses; BP = Bonus Points Pts = Total Points

Premier League Knockout Cup
The 1996 Speedway Star Knockout Cup was the 58th edition of the Knockout Cup for tier one teams and the second with the name Premier League Knockout Cup. Wolverhampton Wolves were the winners of the competition. The following season the tier one teams would compete in the Elite League Knockout Cup and the Premier League Knockout Cup would be for tier two teams.

First round

Second round

Quarter-finals

Semi-finals

Final

First leg

Second leg

Wolverhampton Wolves were declared Knockout Cup Champions, winning on aggregate 100-92.

Leading final averages

Riders & final averages
Belle Vue

 9.27
 8.14
 7.37
 7.33
 6.68
 6.32
 3.84
 3.56
 3.33
 2.56
 0.52

Bradford

 9.57
 9.55
 7.76
 7.52
 4.74
 4.42
 3.07
 2.65
 1.73

Coventry

 9.46
 7.29
 7.11
 6.83
 6.35
 6.24
 5.33
 4.20

Cradley & Stoke

 10.67
 10.55
 6.36
 6.21
 5.08
 4.85
 4.67
 3.58

Eastbourne

 10.08
 8.98
 7.89
 7.34
 5.40
 5.30
 3.00
 2.54
 0.47

Exeter

 9.28 
 8.83
 6.50 
 6.50
 5.96
 4.79
 4.67
 2.66

Hull

 8.58
 8.44
 8.30
 7.00
 6.89
 6.85
 6.16
 5.66
 2.32
 1.90

Ipswich

 10.29
 7.63 
 7.46
 7.42
 5.74
 5.49
 3.30

London

 10.09
 9.07
 7.63
 7.35
 6.07
 5.04
 3.57
 3.48
 1.90
 1.70

Long Eaton

 8.57
 8.28 
 6.73
 6.57
 6.37
 6.26
 6.00
 5.60
 4.00
 3.49

Middlesbrough
 
  8.67
 6.78
 6.78
 6.23
 5.85
 5.82
 4.86
 3.59

Oxford

 
 8.32 
 7.76
 6.88
 5.27
 5.16
 (Mark Frost) 3.74
 3.57
 1.73

Peterborough

 10.20
 9.01 
 8.94 
 6.22
 5.44
 4.90
 4.65
 4.60
 4.00

Poole

 9.38 
 9.13
 8.05
 5.96
 4.53
 4.38
 3.11
 2.07
 2.01

Reading

 8.12
 7.69
 7.20
 6.86
 5.84
 5.02
 4.76
 4.55
 4.54

Scottish Monarchs

 8.53
 6.58
 6.31
 6.30
 6.02
 5.86
 5.67
 5.67

Sheffield

 9.73 
 6.71
 6.69
 6.23
 6.22
 5.58
 3.65
 3.48
 2.71
 2.67

Swindon

 9.22
 8.99
 8.43
 7.05
 5.13
 4.73
 4.45
 1.70

Wolverhampton

 10.14
 9.71
 9.62
 6.12
 5.11
 4.74
 3.41

See also
 List of United Kingdom Speedway League Champions
 Knockout Cup (speedway)

References

Speedway Premier League
1996 in speedway
1996 in British motorsport